Hell's Mouth or Hells Mouth may refer to:

Places
 Hell's Mouth, Cornwall, part of a group of cliff faces in Cornwall, England
 Boca do Inferno (Portuguese for Hell's Mouth), a chasm near Cascais, Portugal
 Porth Neigwl, a bay in Llŷn Peninsula, in Gwynedd, Wales
 RAF Hell's Mouth, a former Royal Air Force Emergency Landing Ground
 Hells Mouth Grits, a geologic formation in Wales

Other uses
 Hells' Mouth, a play by Nick Darke

See also
 Helmond, (literal translation: Hell Mouth) a municipality and a city in the Netherlands
 Hells Canyon, a canyon in Oregon, US